Shizuka Kubota (born 12 July 1983) is a former Japanese cricketer who played five Women's One Day International cricket matches for Japan national women's cricket team in 2003.

References

1983 births
Living people
Japanese women cricketers
Sportspeople from Tokyo
Asian Games medalists in cricket
Cricketers at the 2010 Asian Games
Cricketers at the 2014 Asian Games
Medalists at the 2010 Asian Games
Asian Games bronze medalists for Japan